The Silver Comet is a wooden roller coaster with a hybrid steel frame at Niagara Amusement Park & Splash World in Grand Island, New York.

Walkthrough 
A short drop is encountered immediately after leaving the station, quickly followed by a slight turn to the left.  There is a short, straight section of track that is then followed by a U-turn to the left, leading to the  lift hill. The largest drop on the ride comes immediately after the train reaches the top of the lift hill, which is then followed by a slight turn to the left.  Two small hills are encountered, before a large ascent that is followed by a wide-banked turn to the left and a small drop.  There is a slight turn to the right followed by a large drop.  There is another ascent that leads into a large U-turn to the right.  There is another drop and ascent, followed by another turn to the right.  A third grouping of a drop and ascent is encountered, followed this time by a turn to the left.  A large drop is followed by a series of small hills, which lead into a rough turn to the left that includes changes in elevation.  There is another series of drops and rises, followed by a slight turn to the right and the brake run, parallel to the lift hill.  A small drop follows the brake run, which in turn leads into the station.

Station
The Silver Comet station uses a similar design from the former Comet station at Crystal Beach Park. It is a wide building with a few comets on its facade. Both it and the old Comet station had a tower saying "comet" in five colors.

Train
There is one six-car train, with each car seating four riders for a total of 24 riders  Each car contains individual lapbars, seat belts for each rider, and seat dividers. The train was built by the Philadelphia Toboggan Company. The train was originally Purple, later painted to look like a comet (Red, Orange, Yellow), and eventually was painted a metallic blue. The train itself however, was sold following the parks closure in 2020. It was sold to get refurbished and will eventually be sold again at a later date. The new train is also blue, with red, white, or green stars on the side of the first, second, and last car.

Trivia
The Silver Comet was inspired by the Comet roller coaster that is currently located at The Great Escape and Splashwater Kingdom
This roller coaster has been placed in the top 50 worldwide wooden roller coaster list as of 2010.

References

Roller coasters in New York (state)
Roller coasters introduced in 1999